Arba Sar (also Romanized as Arbā Sar; also known as Jowlandān) is a village in Tula Rud Rural District, in the Central District of Talesh County, Gilan Province, Iran. At the 2006 census, its population was 96, in 21 families.

References 

Populated places in Talesh County